Phantyna is a genus of cribellate araneomorph spiders in the family Dictynidae, and was first described by R. V. Chamberlin in 1948.

Species
 it contains fourteen species:
Phantyna bicornis (Emerton, 1915) – USA, Canada
Phantyna estebanensis (Simon, 1906) – Venezuela
Phantyna mandibularis (Taczanowski, 1874) – Mexico to Brazil
Phantyna meridensis (Caporiacco, 1955) – Venezuela
Phantyna micro (Chamberlin & Ivie, 1944) (type) – USA
Phantyna mulegensis (Chamberlin, 1924) – USA, Mexico
Phantyna pixi (Chamberlin & Gertsch, 1958) – USA
Phantyna provida (Gertsch & Mulaik, 1936) – USA
Phantyna remota (Banks, 1924) – Ecuador (Galapagos Is.)
Phantyna rita (Gertsch, 1946) – USA
Phantyna segregata (Gertsch & Mulaik, 1936) – USA, Mexico
Phantyna terranea (Ivie, 1947) – USA
Phantyna varyna (Chamberlin & Gertsch, 1958) – USA, Mexico
Phantyna v. miranda (Chamberlin & Gertsch, 1958) – USA

References

External links
Phantyna at BugGuide

Araneomorphae genera
Dictynidae
Spiders of North America
Spiders of South America